Jordan Walker is a Canadian politician who was elected in the 2019 Alberta general election to the Legislative Assembly of Alberta representing the electoral district of Sherwood Park. He is a member of the United Conservative Party

He was the 951st Member to be sworn into the Legislative Assembly of Alberta.

Background 
Prior to his election as a Member of the Legislative Assembly of Alberta, Mr. Walker served as a foreign qualification recognition and immigration officer for the Government of Alberta. He speaks basic Japanese and formerly spent a year teaching English as a second language in Japan. He holds both a master’s degree a bachelors degree.

Mr. Walker and his wife Shizuko are residents of Sherwood Park.

Political Activity 
Mr. Walker has served as a member of the Treasury Board, Alberta First Cabinet Policy Committee, and the Standing Committee on Alberta’s Economic Future. In addition to this service, Walker has been a member of the Standing Committee on Families and Communities, the Special Standing Committee on Members’ Services, the Standing Committee on Legislative Offices as well as the Standing Committee on Public Accounts among others. Mr. Walker also previously served as Chair of the Select Special Information and Privacy Commissioner Search Committee.

Mr. Walker has carried on his interest in Japan by speaking to the importance of Japanese-Albertan relations in the legislature.

As a legislator and member of the treasury board Walker has advocated for capital investment in Sherwood Park, particularly at the local hospital and schools.

Electoral History

References

United Conservative Party MLAs
Living people
21st-century Canadian politicians
Year of birth missing (living people)